Hoseynabad (also Romanized as Ḩoseynābād) is a village in Kushk-e Nar Rural District, Kushk-e Nar District, Parsian County, Hormozgan Province, Iran. At the 2006 census, it had a population of 131, in 20 families.

References 

Populated places in Parsian County